Parathyris cedonulli is a moth of the family Erebidae first described by Caspar Stoll in 1781. It is found in French Guiana, Suriname, Brazil, Venezuela, Ecuador, Bolivia, Honduras and Belize.

Subspecies
Parathyris cedonulli cedonulli
Parathyris cedonulli griseata (Rothschild, 1935) (Belize)

References

Phaegopterina
Arctiinae of South America
Moths described in 1781